See the Light is the eighth studio album by American ska punk band Less Than Jake, released on November 12, 2013. as CD, LP and digital download.

Writing and recording
Regarding the album, guitarist and vocalist Chris DeMakes said: "See the Light is pure Less Than Jake. 13 songs that were written, recorded and produced in our hometown of Gainesville, Florida. You never know what people are going to think when you release new music. All you can do is what comes from your heart and we feel like we have accomplished what we set out to do with these new songs. Hopefully our fans will feel the same passion for this album as we do." Bassist and vocalist Roger Lima added: "[this album]'s all new songs and new vibes, only recorded in our old school way."

Then drummer and songwriter Vinnie Fiorello called the lyrics "super-positive". He also ranked it his favorite Less Than Jake album because it was their first album in a long time with no input from outside the band. They produced and wrote it all by themselves. He also says the band applied every lesson it learned in previous albums. Lima co-produced the album with the rest of the band at the Moathouse; he also acted as an engineer with Matt Yonker. Jason Livermore mixed and mastered the album at the Blasting Room.

Lima reverberated that, stating it was a "back to basics" album because they did not have any kind of orientation when they started. He also described the artwork:

Promotion and release
The album release was supported by a North American tour, and the band is also planning some shows in Canada, Southeastern United States, Japan, Brazil and the United Kingdom. "Do the Math" was released to radio on June 2, 2014, and released as a single on June 10 with "Connect the Dots" as the B-side. "American Idle" was released as a single, with "Late Night Petroleum" as the B-side, on January 20, 2015.

Track listing 
Track listing per booklet.

Charts

Personnel
Personnel per booklet.

Less Than Jake
 Chris DeMakes – vocals, guitar
 Roger Lima – vocals, bass
 Vinnie Fiorello – drums
 Buddy Schaub – trombone
 Peter "JR" Wasilewski – tenor saxophone

Production and design
 Roger Lima – producer, engineer
 Less Than Jake – producer
 Jason Livermore – mixing, mastering
 Matt Yonker – engineer
 Horsebites – layout, design

References

External links

See the Light at YouTube (streamed copy where licensed)

2013 albums
Less Than Jake albums
Fat Wreck Chords albums